Bavla taluk is a taluk of Ahmedabad district of Gujarat state in western part of India . Bavla is the headquarters of this taluka. Bhogavo river passes through this taluk .

Villages

References

Ahmedabad district
Talukas of Gujarat